Vincentian Americans are Americans of full or partial Vincentian origin or ancestry.

Notable people

Gloria Davy, singer
Adonal Foyle, retired professional basketball center
Ezra Hendrickson, retired professional soccer midfielder
Arthur French, actor and director
Shake Keane, jazz musician and poet
Sophia Young, professional women's basketball player

See also
Saint Vincent and the Grenadines–United States relations

References 

 
Saint Vincent and the Grenadines diaspora
Caribbean American